"Curfew" is a song by Drive, released as their first and only single in 1993. The lead vocals were by Julienne Davis and it featured Melanie Blatt, who later became known as a member of All Saints, under the name Melanie Guillaume. The single was released both in the United Kingdom and Germany.

Track listing

Song information

References

1993 debut singles
Melanie Blatt songs
1993 songs
Ninja Tune singles